Puliancholai is a hamlet of about 30 families and 10-15 teashops in the dense forest region of the same name on the foot hills of Kolli Hills (Eastern Ghats) Tamil Nadu, India. It is located in Tiruchirapalli district, approximately 72 km away from Tiruchirappalli (district headquarters) by road. The nearest town (about 30 km) is Thuraiyur B Mettur.and Thammampatti. Puliancholai can be also reached from Erode or Namakkal.

Tourism
The area is rich in cultural heritage, being the centre of Chola architecture. Numerous temples, monuments, and other examples of architecture unique to that area dot the region. Lack of a proper shelter or basic facilities is the only limitation for long stays. 

Apart from tourists, devotees come to trek up to a Shiva temple about 12 km into the forest in June and July. Apart from tourism, their main livelihood is in marginal agriculture and gathering the fruits that grow wild in the forest to sell to local markets.

A few hours travel by road would take one to Pachaimalai Hills, another hill range with a 150-ft waterfall. 
In the neighbouring Perambalur district there are areas like Vettakudi and Karavatti bird sanctuaries.

Nature
Kolli Hills are known for their medicinal herbs. A few kilometres into the forest, in the higher hills called Agaya Gangai (Heavenly Ganges), there are water falls, part of a river system that feeds the stream at Puliancholai. The stream is known locally as Iyyaar or Kallaar; it grows into a wild river during rains, and is believed to have medicinal properties.

Puliancholai was an undisturbed area of shrub jungle and riverine forests rich in wildlife.

External links 
Tourist Info

Villages in Tiruchirappalli district